Dipsas bucephala, the neotropical  snail-eater, is a non-venomous snake found in Brazil, Paraguay, and Argentina.

References

Dipsas
Snakes of South America
Reptiles of Brazil
Reptiles of Paraguay
Reptiles of Argentina
Reptiles described in 1802